Michael Winsauer (born 6 August 1982) is an Austrian retired football defender and current manager of FC Sarmenstorf.

Besides Austria, Winsauer has played in New Zealand and Switzerland. He ended his career after the 2013–14 season.

Coaching career
In the summer 2017, Winsauer was appointed assistant coach of FC Wohlen's U-23 team. He left the position at the end of the season.

In June 2019, Winsauer took charge of Swiss club FC Sarmenstorf.

References

External links
 
 

Austrian footballers
Austrian expatriate footballers
Association football defenders
1982 births
Living people
Austria youth international footballers
Austria under-21 international footballers
People from Kitzbühel District
Team Wellington players
FC Lustenau players
1. FC Vöcklabruck players
SC Schwanenstadt players
SC-ESV Parndorf 1919 players
FC Wohlen players
Austrian expatriate sportspeople in Australia
Austrian expatriate sportspeople in Switzerland
Expatriate footballers in Switzerland
Expatriate soccer players in Australia
Footballers from Tyrol (state)